Siddiq Khan (2 March 1947 – 21 October 2007) was a Pakistani cricket umpire. He stood in five One Day International (ODI) games between 1990 and 1995.

See also
 List of One Day International cricket umpires

References

External links

1947 births
2007 deaths
Pakistani One Day International cricket umpires
Cricketers from Delhi
Pakistani cricketers
Lahore cricketers